The 1953–54 season was Blackpool F.C.'s 46th season (43rd consecutive) in the Football League. They competed in the 22-team Division One, then the top tier of English football, finishing sixth.

West Bromwich Albion succeeded Blackpool as the holders of the FA Cup. Blackpool were knocked out in the fifth round by Port Vale.

Stan Mortensen was the club's top scorer for the tenth consecutive season, with 22 goals (21 in the league and one in the FA Cup).

Table

Notes

References

Blackpool F.C.
Blackpool F.C. seasons